Hectic is the debut EP by the American ska punk band Operation Ivy. It was released in January 1988 through Lookout! Records (LK 003). Hectic is credited as one of the first ska-core records.

In 1991, all 6 tracks from Hectic were later released on the self-titled compilation album, which also featured all the tracks from Energy and two tracks from the Turn It Around! compilation. Hectic was re-released on 12-inch vinyl by Hellcat Records on April 18, 2012.

Larry Livermore, founder of Lookout! Records, has said that Lookout! was founded solely to release an Operation Ivy record. Lookout! Records was in fact started with simply a PO Box in order to release records by Livermore's own band, The Lookouts. This was said to emphasize Operation Ivy's importance in Lookout! Records' catalog.

Influence
Hectic is often overshadowed by Energy, mainly because the songs on Hectic are included on  Energy. However, Hectic'' is widely regarded as the first ska-core record.

Track listing

Personnel
 Jesse Michaels – lead vocals
 Lint – guitar, backing vocals, lead vocals on intro of "Here We Go Again"
 Matt McCall – bass, backing vocals
 Dave Mello – drums, backing vocals

Additional musicians
 Pat Mello – backing vocals

Production
 Kevin Army – producer, engineer
 Operation Ivy – producers
 John Golden – mastering
 Jesse Michaels – cover art, booklet
 David Hayes (credited as “Sprocket”) – back cover, labels
 Murray Bowles; Cammie Toloui; Cesar Rubio; Vivian Sayles – photography

References

1988 debut EPs
Lookout! Records EPs
Operation Ivy (band) albums
Ska punk EPs